The 1996 'Friendship Cup' , also known as the 1996 Sahara 'Friendship Cup'  for sponsorship reasons was a One Day International cricket series which took place between 14–23 September 1996.  The tournament was held in Canada, which was seen as perfect neutral territory for India and Pakistan to play each other. The tournament was won by Pakistan, who won the series 3-2. This was the first edition of the annual event.

Squads

Match results

1st ODI

2nd ODI

3rd ODI

4th ODI

5th ODI

Records
Dravid and Mohammad Azharuddin put on a partnership of 161 runs in the second ODI- highest third wicket partnership for India in ODIs eclipsing the previous best of 158 runs put up by Navjot Singh Sidhu and Mohinder Amarnath against New Zealand.
Azhar and Saleem Malik crossed 6000 runs in ODIs during the series.

References

External links
 Tournament home at ESPN Cricinfo

1996 in Canadian cricket
1996 in cricket
International cricket competitions from 1994–95 to 1997
Indian cricket seasons from 1970–71 to 1999–2000
1996 in Indian cricket
One Day International cricket competitions
International cricket competitions in Canada
International sports competitions in Toronto